Nowy Śleszów  (German: Neu Schliesa, Neu Schlesing) is a village in the administrative district of Gmina Żórawina, within Wrocław County, Lower Silesian Voivodeship, in south-western Poland.

References

Villages in Wrocław County